Walter Henrique da Silva (born 22 July 1989), known simply as Walter, is a Brazilian professional footballer who plays as a striker for  Afogados .

Early life
Born in Recife, Pernambuco, Walter was the youngest of six siblings born to his mother Edith, all the four males' names starting with the letter "W" (himself, Waldemir, Waldex and Wandeork). During his childhood, he viewed the dead bodies of two people who had just been murdered inside a bus, including that of his brother Waldemir at the age of 18 due to gang-related issues.

Club career

Early years
Walter started his career with Sport Club do Recife, finishing his youth development at Sport Club Internacional after joining its junior team in 2007. He made his professional debut two years later.

Walter played 11 matches in his first season in the Série A, but failed to score any goals. In May 2009, he suffered a serious knee injury which sidelined him for several months.

Porto
In August 2010, Walter joined FC Porto from Portugal, signing a five-year contract. The Primeira Liga club acquired the player's registration rights and 75% of his economic rights from Uruguayan side C.A. Rentistas for €6 million, and later sold 25% to Pearl Design Holding Ltd. (a UK shell company, directed by Mário Jorge Queiroz e Castro) for €2.125 million; Sport Club Internacional announced in its annual accounts that the club had received R$9,192,000 in transfer fee (around €4 million), but part of that was re-distributed to third parties for R$1,980,033– it was also reported that the side owned 50% of the player's economic rights, with the other half belonging to third parties.

Walter played his first official game for Porto on 19 August 2010 in a UEFA Europa League play-off round against K.R.C. Genk, featuring eight minutes in a 3–0 away win. On 16 October 2010 he made his first start, scoring a hat-trick in the 4–1 home victory over A.D. Os Limianos in the third round of the Taça de Portugal. The following month, again as a starter, he netted his first league goal, at home against Portimonense SC (2–0).

Walter spent the vast majority of his first season as a backup to Radamel Falcao, but managed to finish with ten goals in all competitions in 25 appearances. On 15 October 2011, he scored four in a 8–0 away rout of C.A. Pêro Pinheiro in the domestic cup.

Subsequently, Walter was loaned several times by Porto, alternating between his country's Série A and B. Throughout his career, he struggled immensely with weight problems.

In August 2018, while at the service of Centro Sportivo Alagoano, Walter was arrested at his home in Maceió, after allegedly pointing a toy gun to an Eletrobras employee. On 11 December, he tested positive for furosemide and sibutramine metabolites after a match against Grêmio Esportivo Brasil, being suspended until further notice. The banned substances were found in prescription drugs he had been taking to fight his obesity problem.

International career
Walter played with Brazil under-20s in the 2009 South American Championship. He scored five goals in the tournament held in Venezuela, being crowned top scorer as the national team won their tenth title in the category.

Club statistics

Honours
Internacional
Copa Libertadores: 2010

Porto
Primeira Liga: 2010–11, 2011–12
Taça de Portugal: 2010–11
UEFA Europa League: 2010–11

Goiás
Campeonato Brasileiro Série B: 2012
Campeonato Goiano: 2013

Atlético Paranaense
Campeonato Paranaense: 2016

Brazil
South American Youth Football Championship: 2009

Individual
Campeonato Brasileiro Série A Team of the Year: 2013

References

External links

1989 births
Living people
Sportspeople from Recife
Brazilian footballers
Association football forwards
Campeonato Brasileiro Série A players
Campeonato Brasileiro Série B players
Campeonato Brasileiro Série C players
Esporte Clube São José players
Sport Club Internacional players
Cruzeiro Esporte Clube players
Goiás Esporte Clube players
Fluminense FC players
Club Athletico Paranaense players
Atlético Clube Goianiense players
Paysandu Sport Club players
Centro Sportivo Alagoano players
Esporte Clube Vitória players
Associação Desportiva São Caetano players
Botafogo Futebol Clube (SP) players
Santa Cruz Futebol Clube players
Amazonas Futebol Clube players
Goiânia Esporte Clube players
Primeira Liga players
FC Porto players
UEFA Europa League winning players
Brazil under-20 international footballers
Brazilian expatriate footballers
Expatriate footballers in Portugal
Brazilian expatriate sportspeople in Portugal
Brazilian sportspeople in doping cases
Doping cases in association football